Danville is a town in and the county seat of Hendricks County, Indiana, United States. The population was 9,001 at the 2010 census, up from 6,418 at the 2000 census. In 2019 the estimated population was 10,126.

History
Danville was founded in 1824, and its post office one year later. Danville was incorporated as a town in 1835.

The Ora Adams House, Leander Campbell House, Danville Courthouse Square Historic District, Danville Main Street Historic District, Dr. Jeremiah and Ann Jane DePew House, Hendricks County Jail and Sheriff's Residence, Twin Bridges, and Wilson-Courtney House are listed on the National Register of Historic Places.

Geography
Danville is located at the center of Hendricks County at  (39.760736, −86.517798). U.S. Route 36 is the town's Main Street, leading east  to downtown Indianapolis and west  to Decatur, Illinois. Indiana State Road 39 joins US-36 briefly in the center of town but leads north  to Lizton and Interstate 74, and south  to Center Valley and Interstate 70.

The West Fork of White Lick Creek, a tributary of the White River, flows north-to-south through the eastern side of the town.

Airport
2R2 - Hendricks County Airport

Demographics

2010 census
As of the census of 2010, there were 9,001 people, 3,344 households, and 2,398 families living in the town. The racial makeup of the town was 96.8% White, 0.8% African American, 0.2% Native American, 0.4% Asian, 0.4% from other races, and 1.4% from two or more races. Hispanic or Latino people of any race were 1.8% of the population.

There were 3,344 households, of which 41.2% had children under the age of 18 living with them, 55.4% were married couples living together, 11.9% had a female householder with no husband present, 4.3% had a male householder with no wife present, and 28.3% were non-families. 23.0% of all households were made up of individuals, and 10.1% had someone living alone who was 65 years of age or older. The average household size was 2.66 and the average family size was 3.14.

The median age in the town was 34.3 years. 29.3% of residents were under the age of 18; 7.6% were between the ages of 18 and 24; 28% were from 25 to 44; 23.3% were from 45 to 64; and 11.6% were 65 years of age or older. The gender makeup of the town was 48.5% male and 51.5% female.

2000 census
 
As of the census of 2000, there were 8,032 people, 2,350 households, and 1,670 families living in the town. The racial makeup of the town was 98.38% White, 0.34% African American, 0.22% Native American, 0.26% Asian, 0.02% Pacific Islander, 0.11% from other races, and 0.67% from two or more races. Hispanic or Latino people of any race were 1.06% of the population.

There were 2,350 households, out of which 37.6% had children under the age of 18 living with them, 58.7% were married couples living together, 8.7% had a female householder with no husband present, and 28.9% were non-families. 25.1% of all households were made up of individuals, and 12.5% had someone living alone who was 65 years of age or older. The average household size was 2.58 and the average family size was 3.11.

In the town, the population was spread out, with 27.6% under the age of 18, 8.4% from 18 to 24, 30.3% from 25 to 44, 20.0% from 45 to 64, and 13.8% who were 65 years of age or older. The median age was 35 years. For every 100 females there were 98.3 males. For every 100 females age 18 and over, there were 95.0 males.

The median income for a household in the town was $54,330, and the median income for a family was $62,813. Males had a median income of $40,724 versus $26,678 for females. The per capita income for the town was $22,209. About 2.1% of families and 2.5% of the population were below the poverty line, including 1.3% of those under age 18 and 7.7% of those age 65 or over.

Arts and culture

Museums and other points of interest
The Hendricks County Historical Museum is located in the former Sheriff's Residence and Jail at 170 South Washington in Danville. The building was erected in 1866 and served as the county jail until 1974. The two-story brick structure, listed on the National Register of Historic Places, is the only surviving example of the Second Empire style of architecture in the county. This style was popular after the American Civil War and has as defining elements a central tower and mansard roof. The Museum's collection includes items relating to domestic life, agriculture, military history, education and other aspects of Hendricks county's heritage. It also includes items relating to the history of Indiana Central Normal College (later Canterbury College), which was located in Danville from 1878 until 1951.

Education
Danville Community School Corporation, the school district which serves Danville, operates Danville Community High School, a secondary school (grades 9 through 12) located just off of U.S. Route 36. The mascot of Danville Community Schools is a Warrior in American Indian clothing. The school colors are crimson and gray.  Other facilities operated by the school corporation are:
Danville Middle School
South Elementary School
North Elementary School
Opportunity House

The town has a lending library, the Danville-Center Township Public Library.

Notable people
 John Cravens, Registrar of Indiana University 1895–1936; raised in Danville and graduated from Central Indiana Normal College in Danville
 James M. Ogden, 26th Indiana Attorney General; born in Danville
 Bob Snyder, musician known for playing tenor sax, alto sax, clarinet, and flute; born in Danville
 Travis Steele, head coach of the Xavier Musketeers men's basketball team
 Sam Thompson, 19th-century Major League Baseball player born in Danville

See also
 Holistic Image VIII, public artwork in front of the Town Hall

Neighboring communities

References

External links

 Town of Danville official website
 Hendricks County Convention and Visitors Bureau
 City-Data.com, statistical data

Populated places established in 1824
Towns in Hendricks County, Indiana
County seats in Indiana
1824 establishments in Indiana